Acrobasis carpinivorella is a species of snout moth in the genus Acrobasis. It was described by Herbert H. Neunzig in 1970, and is known from Ontario, Canada, and the eastern United States.

There is one generation per year.

The larvae feed on Carpinus caroliniana. The species overwinters in the larval stage. In spring, the larvae leave their winter shelter and resume feeding on the leaves of their host plant. They construct a silken tube on the underside of a recently expanded leaf. Last instar larvae leave the tube and resume feeding on the terminal leaf or shoot, again forming a tube. Pupation takes place in a pupal chamber which is constructed at the end of this tube.

References

Moths described in 1970
Acrobasis
Moths of North America